Andriy Matviyevych Bobyr (13 November 1915 – 18 May 1994), People's Artist of Ukraine (1986).

Andriy Bobyr was born in the village of Nychyporivka, in the Poltava Governorate of the Russian Empire.

He was known as a bandurist, teacher and conductor. In 1931 he completed his studies at the Kiev Music Tekhnikum, and in 1947 the conservatory (class of Hryhory Veriovka). In 1951 he completed post graduate studies.

In 1936 he became a member of the Radio Bandurist Capella and later its director.

During World War II he became a fighter pilot. In 1946 he returned to Kiev to direct the Radio Bandurist Capella. In 1965 the Capella was transformed into the Orchestra of Ukrainian Folk instruments of the Ukrainian Television and Radio.

Bobyr was teacher of bandura at the Kiev Conservatory from 1938 to 1941, and from 1949 to 1979.

His repertoire included numerous dumy (sung epic poems):

 Marusia Bohuslavka 
 The three brothers from Oziv 
 About the widow and her three sons.

Students
Mykola Hvozd', Serhiy Bashtan, Vasyl' Herasymenko, N. Moskvina, Andriy Omelchenko, Victor Kukhta, V. Lobko, Yuri Demchuk, Mykola Nechyporenko,  Volodymyr Voyt

Sources
Kudrytsky, A. V. - Mystetsvo Ukrainy - Biohrafichnyj dovidnyk, K, 1997 
Hvozd', M - Banduryst Andriy Bobyr - NTE 1994 #5-6 p. 89-90 
Kyrdan, B - Omelchenko, A - Narodni spivtsi-muzykanty na Ukraini - Kiev, 1980 
Nemyrovych, Ivan - Vziav by ia banduru - Kiev, 1986 
Chonohuz, Yaroslav - Z Pal'tsiv ta strun ... - Ukrajins'ka Kul'tura #2. 1996 
Zheplynsky, B. - Korotka istoriya kobzarstva v Ukrayini - Lviv, 2000

Bandurists
Academic staff of Kyiv Conservatory
Kobzars
Ukrainian musicians
Recipients of the title of Merited Artist of Ukraine
1994 deaths
1915 births
Ukrainian music educators
Soviet musicians